Ganodermadiol (ganoderol B) is a sterol isolated from Ganoderma.

References

Sterols